The 1951 McNeese State Cowboys football team was an American football team that represented McNeese State College (now known as McNeese State University) as an independent during the 1951 college football season. In their sixth year under head coach Albert I. Ratcliff, the team compiled an overall record of 5–4–1. After the regular season, McNeese defeated  in the Cosmopolitan Bowl.

Schedule

References

McNeese State
McNeese Cowboys football seasons
McNeese State Cowboys football